Gloria Helenly Mills  (born 1957 or 1958) is a British trade union official.

Education
Mills has a Master of Business Administration degree from the Open University, in addition to an honorary degree from Staffordshire University.

Career
Mills worked in legal publishing, where she joined the National Society of Operative Printers and Assistants. She was elected as Mother of the Chapel, representing other trade unionists at her workplace, before taking a full-time post with the Society of Graphical and Allied Trades. In 1985, she moved to work for the National Union of Public Employees (NUPE) as an area officer in the London Division, before being promoted to a national officer post responsible for equalities work within the union.

In 1993, NUPE merged with two other unions to form Unison, and Mills became its director of equal opportunities.  Two years later, she was elected to the General Council of the Trades Union Congress (TUC), also serving on its executive committee from 2000, chairing its race committee and sitting on its women's committee. She was elected as President of the Trades Union Congress from 2005 to 2006.

Mills has been active with the European Trade Union Confederation, and was elected as president of its women's committee in 2015.

Mills also served on the Commission for Racial Equality. She has been active in the Labour Party over many years and is a National Executive Member of BAME Labour.

Honours
Mills was made a Member of the Order of the British Empire in 1999, and was awarded the Commander of the Order of the British Empire in 2005.

References

1950s births
Living people
Alumni of the Open University
British trade unionists
Members of the General Council of the Trades Union Congress
Presidents of the Trades Union Congress
Labour Party (UK) people
Commanders of the Order of the British Empire
Black British women politicians